Avenida del Libertador may refer to:

 Avenida del Libertador (Buenos Aires), a road in Buenos Aires, Argentina.
 Avenida del Libertador (Montevideo), a road in Montevideo, the capital city of Uruguay.